Newbiggin is a hamlet very close to Askrigg, North Yorkshire, England.

The name is first recorded in 1288 as Neubigging, and like other similarly-named places within North Yorkshire, it means New Building.

References

Villages in North Yorkshire
Askrigg